Ain't We Got Fun is a 1937 Merrie Melodies cartoon directed by Tex Avery. The cartoon was released on May 1, 1937. The title is based on the popular song of the same name.

This is one of a rare handful of Warner Bros. cartoons (which also include "The Night Watchman", "We, the Animals - Squeak!", "Scaredy Cat", "Claws for Alarm" and "Kiss Me Cat") in which the cats are depicted as the heroes and the mice as the villains rather than vice versa.

Plot
The plotline concerns a cat who is tricked by a group of fun-loving mice into taking the blame for the mess they created and getting thrown out of the house into the snow by his cantankerous old owner. The mice then do a song routine of the title song, and have taken over by the time the old man realizes what is happening. The old man begs the cat to come back and take care of the rodent problem, but the cat, pride wounded, stubbornly refuses and remains in the snow. When the mice in the house taunt him, "You are a fraidy cat! Ha, ha, ha!", the cat's pride can only be satisfied by rushing back into the house and chasing the mice into the snow, at which point the old owner acts kindly to the cat.

Home media
LaserDisc - The Golden Age of Looney Tunes, Volume 5, Side 2 (USA 1995 Turner print)
DVD - The Life of Emile Zola (unrestored; bonus feature)

References

External links
 
 Ain't We Got Fun at the Big Cartoon Database

1937 short films
1937 animated films
Merrie Melodies short films
Animated films about cats
Animated films about mice
Films directed by Tex Avery
Films scored by Carl Stalling
Warner Bros. Cartoons animated short films
1930s Warner Bros. animated short films